A 'book tune' is a summary of a book in song format, which acts as a mnemonic device, to help readers remember what they've read. The concept was first conceived by Jonathan Sauer and created in collaboration with Abdominal.

Book tunes have been created for several books including The How of Happiness, by Sonja Lyubomirsky, and The Scarlet Letter, by Nathaniel Hawthorne.

References 

Mnemonics